This is a list of Pashto language poets.

Folkloric
 Amir Kror Suri

16th century
 Pir Roshan, poet, warrior, intellectual (1525–1585)

17th and 18th century
 Khushal Khattak (1613–1689) born in Nowshaar Province, Peshawar,Afghanistan, he was a poet, warrior, and chief. 
 Nazo Tokhi (1651–1717) born at Kandahar, she was a poetess and mother of Mirwais Hotak. 
 Rahman Baba (1653–1711) born at Lakkimarwat, poet. 
 Abdul Hamid Baba (?–c.1732) born near Peshawer, he was a poet.
 Hussain Hotak (?–1738) born at Kandahar, poet, king. 
 Afzal Khan Khattak (?–c.1770) poet, grandson of Khushal Khattak.
 Ahmad Shah Durrani (1723–1773) born at Kandahar he was a poet, king, founder of Afghanistan.

20th century and beyond

A
Khatir Afridi
Abaseen Yousafzai

D
Rahmatullah Dard
Tahir Dawar

F
Farigh Bukhari

J
Abdul Bari Jahani

K
Pir Mohammad Karwan
Hafizullah Khaled
Ghani Khan
Ajmal Khattak
Pareshan Khattak

L
Sulaiman Layeq
Arman Loni
Wranga Loni

M
Qalandar Momand
Abdul Ali Mustaghni
Matiullah Turab
Matiullah Qureshi
Munair Jan Bunari

P
Pir Gohar

R
Riaz Tasneem
Rehman baba

S
Rahmat Shah Sail
Amanullah Sailaab Sapi
Hamza Shinwari 
Kabir Stori
Salma Shaheen
Sahib Shah Sabir

T
Sherzaman Taizi

Z
Mohammad Hashem Zamani
Ezatullah Zawab

Pashto language
Pashto
Pashto-language poets